The 1967 Gent–Wevelgem was the 29th edition of the Gent–Wevelgem cycle race and was held on 29 March 1967. The race started in Ghent and finished in Wevelgem. The race was won by Eddy Merckx of the Peugeot team.

General classification

References

Gent–Wevelgem
1967 in road cycling
1967 in Belgian sport
March 1967 sports events in Europe